Hélio Alberto Delgado Silva (born 16 March 1998), commonly known as Papalélé, is a Cape Verdean footballer who plays as a forward for Portuguese club Anadia on loan from Estrela da Amadora.

Career statistics

Club

Notes

International

International goals
Scores and results list Cape Verde's goal tally first.

References

1998 births
Living people
Cape Verdean footballers
Cape Verde international footballers
Association football forwards
CS Mindelense players
FC Porto B players
Leixões S.C. players
C.D.C. Montalegre players
C.F. Estrela da Amadora players
Anadia F.C. players
Liga Portugal 2 players
Cape Verdean expatriate footballers
Expatriate footballers in Portugal
Cape Verdean expatriate sportspeople in Portugal